Class 57 may refer to:
 British Rail Class 57
 DRG Class 57, a German goods locomotive class with a 0-10-0 wheel  arrangement operated by the Deutsche Reichsbahn and comprising the:
 Class 57.0: Saxon XI V
 Class 57.0II: BBÖ 180, PKP-Class Tw11
 Class 57.1: Saxon XI H
 Class 57.1–5II: BBÖ 80, PKP-Class Tw12, JDŽ 28
 Class 57.2: Saxon XI HV
 Class 57.3: Württemberg H
 Class 57.4: Württemberg Hh
 Class 57.5: Bavarian G 5/5
 Class 57.6: BBÖ 480
 Class 57.7: ČSD Class 524.2
 Class 57.8: JDŽ 134
 Class 57.9: PH I
 Class 57.10–35: Prussian G 10